King James I Academy (formally known as King James I Community Arts College) is a medium size academy school and sixth form centre for mixed gender aged 11–18 in the town of Bishop Auckland in County Durham in northeast England. It traces its history to the early 17th century. The site currently consists of two large two-storey buildings as well as a few small cabins, including the "Kings Feast" which is used to sell food at breaks, lunches and special occasions. The others are used as classrooms or form rooms similar to the rooms inside the other buildings.

History 
Opened in 1605, by King James I of England it went through multiple transformations and renaming. It was mainly known as King James 1st Grammar School and became the first secondary school in south-west Durham to be upgraded to academy status.

In an interview, Elizabeth Varley (Chair Of Governors For The Academy and former student) described how many years ago, students had to pass a test to be able to attend the academy since at the time it was a Grammar School where boys and girls were educated separately. 
She also revealed that the current Art block was not part of the original Middle School building, and that it was added at a later date to house a school swimming pool (which has since been blocked up).

In 2022 there were 944 students in the academy, with 136 of them being sixth formers. Its staff including representatives from Connexions and the NHS.

Ofsted inspections
As of the last inspection in 2022, Ofsted reports this in regards to attending the school:

Uniform 
The uniform exists for students in years 7 to 11 and consists of:

 Black trousers or skirt.
 A blazer with the King James logo or a plain black v-neck jumper.
 Smart, black shoes. (No trainers or sandals).
 A plain white t-shirt or shirt.
 A school tie (black, blue and gold in colour).

Notable former pupils

 William Armstrong, 1st Baron Armstrong, who founded Armstrong Whitworth
 Keith Hampson, Conservative MP from February 1974 - 1983 for Ripon, then Leeds Northwest from 1983 to 1997
 Harold Heslop, writer
 Derek Hodgson, priest
 Stan Laurel, comedian
 Andrew Nelson, footballer for Dundee F.C.
 Harold Orton, Professor of English Language and Medieval English Literature from 1946 to 1964 at the University of Leeds
 Tom Stanage, Bishop of Bloemfontein from 1982 to 1997
 Thomas Wright, astronomer

References

External links
 King James I Academy, official website
 King James I Academy, Bishop Auckland, Gov.UK

Academies in County Durham
Educational institutions established in the 1600s
1605 establishments in England
Secondary schools in County Durham
Bishop Auckland